The 2010 AFC President's Cup was the sixth edition of the AFC President's Cup, an annual international association football competition between domestic clubs sides run by the Asian Football Confederation (AFC).

Venues

Qualifying teams

Group stage

The draw for the AFC President's Cup 2010 was held at AFC House on 5 March 1500 hours local time.

Group A

Group B

Group C

Best runner-up
The best runners-up team from among the three pools qualify for the semi-finals. Because group C consists of only three teams, matches against fourth-placed sides in the other groups are excluded from the following comparison.

Note on tie-breaking situation:
 HTTU Aşgabat placed ahead of Abahani Ltd. on the basis of goal difference

Final stage
The final stage of the competition will be played in Myanmar from 24 to 26 September. The semi-final draw was made on 11 July.

Semi-finals

Final

See also 
2010 AFC Cup
2010 AFC Champions League

Notes

References

2010
3
2010 in Bangladeshi football
2010 in Burmese football
2010
2010